Teran Matthews (born February 14, 1980) is a former swimmer from Saint Vincent and the Grenadines, who specialized in sprint freestyle events. Matthews competed only in the women's 50 m freestyle at the 2000 Summer Olympics in Sydney. She received a ticket from FINA, under a Universality program, in an entry time of 31.87. She challenged six other swimmers in heat two, including Cambodia's two-time Olympian Hem Raksmey and Maldives' 13-year-old Fariha Fathimath. Diving in with a 0.94-second deficit, she scorched the field with a quick pace to a fifth-seeded time of 31.87 and slash off her entry standard by 16-hundredths of a second. Matthews failed to advance into the semifinals, as she placed sixty-seventh overall in the prelims.

References

1980 births
Living people
Saint Vincent and the Grenadines female swimmers
Olympic swimmers of Saint Vincent and the Grenadines
Swimmers at the 2000 Summer Olympics
Saint Vincent and the Grenadines female freestyle swimmers